Ioannes III (Iōannēs G΄) may refer to:

 Patriarch John III of Constantinople (died in 577)
 John III Doukas Vatatzes (c. 1192–1254), Byzantine Emperor
 John III Megas Komnenos (c. 1321–1362), Emperor of Trebizond

See also
John III (disambiguation)